Phoner and PhonerLite are softphone applications for Windows operating systems available as freeware. Phoner is a multiprotocol telephony application supporting telephony via CAPI, TAPI and VoIP, while PhonerLite provides a specialized and optimized user interface for VoIP only. Beside the different user interface focus both programs share the same code base.

Both programs use the Session Initiation Protocol for VoIP call signalisation. Calls are supported via server-based infrastructure or direct IP to IP. Media streams are transmitted via the Real-time Transport Protocol which may be encrypted with the Secure Real-time Transport Protocol (SRTP) and the ZRTP security protocols. Phoner provides as well an interface for configuring and using all supplementary ISDN services provided via CAPI and thus needs an ISDN terminal adapter hardware installed in the computer.

Both programs support IPv4 and IPv6 connections by using UDP, TCP and TLS.

Supported audio formats 

 G.711 A-law: 64 kbit/s payload, 8 kHz sampling rate
 G.711 μ-law: 64 kbit/s payload, 8 kHz sampling rate
 G.722: 64 kbit/s payload, 16 kHz sampling rate
 G.726: 16, 24, 32 or 40 kbit/s payload, 8 kHz sampling rate
 GSM: 13 kbit/s payload, 8 kHz sampling rate
 iLBC: 13.3 or 15.2 kbit/s payload, 8 kHz sampling rate
 Speex narrow band: 15 kbit/s payload, 8 kHz sampling rate
 Speex wide band: 30 kbit/s payload, 16 kHz sampling rate
 Opus: 10-50 kbit/s, up to 48 kHz sampling rate
 G.729: 8 kbit/s payload, 8 kHz sampling rate
 Linear PCM: 705 kbit/s payload, 44.1 kHz sampling rate

See also 
 Comparison of VoIP software
 List of SIP software
 Opportunistic encryption

References

External links 
Phoner Main Website

VoIP software
Cryptographic software
Internet privacy software
Secure communication